The Russian political term leaderism (vozhdism) means "a policy directed at the affirmation/confirmation of one person in the role of an indisputable or infallible leader". Vozhdism is widespread in totalitarian and authoritarian régimes. Manifestations of vozhdism include clientelism, nepotism, tribalism, and messianism.

Ancient Greek tyranny, as described in  the  Politics  by Aristotle,
represents an early form of leaderism. Forms of leaderism include Italian Fascism, Führerprinzip, Stalinism, Maoism, and Juche. According to Nikolai Berdyaev (1874-1948), Leninism represented a new type of leaderism, featuring a leader of masses having dictatorship powers, while Joseph Stalin as vozhd exemplifies an ultimate type of such a Supreme leader.

In communist phraseology the term "leaderism" occurs as a pejorative, in opposition to the officially proclaimed "principle of collective leadership".

Some modern Russian authors have implied that the régimes of Mikheil Saakashvili, Islamic leaders, and Vladimir Putin
represent types of leaderist societies.

See also 
Autocracy
Caesarism
Caudillo
Cult of personality
Dictatorship
Strongman
Supreme leader

References 

Political terminology

ja:ヴォジュディズム
ru:Вождизм